The Asia/Oceania Zone was one of the four zones within Group 3 of the regional Davis Cup competition in 2016. The zone's competition was held in round robin format in Tehran, Iran, in July 2016. Two nations won promotion to Group II, Asia/Oceania Zone, for 2017 and two nations got relegated to Group IV, Asia/Oceania Zone, for 2017.

Participating nations

Draw
Date: 11–16 July 2016

Location: Enghelab Sports Complex, Tehran, Iran (clay)

Format: Round-robin basis. Two pools of four and five teams, respectively (Pools A and B). The winner of each pool plays off against the runner-up of the other pool to determine which two nations are promoted to Asia/Oceania Zone Group II in 2017.

Seeding: The seeding was based on the Davis Cup Rankings of 7 March 2016 (shown in parentheses below).

{| class="wikitable"
!width=25%|Pot 1
!width=25%|Pot 2
!width=25%|Pot 3
!width=25%|Pot 4
|-
|
  (87)
  (90)
|
   (93)
  (95)
|
  (96)
  (97)
|
   (99)
  (100)
  (103)
|}

Group A

Group B

First round

Group A

Iran vs. Pacific Oceania

Turkmenistan vs. Hong Kong

Iran vs. Hong Kong

Turkmenistan vs. Pacific Oceania

Iran vs. Turkmenistan

Hong Kong vs. Pacific Oceania

Group B

Lebanon vs. Cambodia

Singapore vs. Qatar

Syria vs. Singapore

Cambodia vs. Qatar

Syria vs. Qatar

Lebanon vs. Singapore

Syria vs. Cambodia

Lebanon vs. Qatar

Syria vs. Lebanon

Cambodia vs. Singapore

Play-offs

Promotional

Iran vs. Syria

Hong Kong vs. Lebanon

Relegation

Pacific Oceania vs. Singapore

Turkmenistan vs. Cambodia

References

External links
Official Website

Asia/Oceania Zone Group III
Davis Cup Asia/Oceania Zone